State Route 421 (SR 421) is a  north-south state highway in Hardin and Henderson counties of eastern West Tennessee. It connects the community of Lebanon with the town of Sardis via Hinkle.

Route description

SR 421 begins in Lebanon at an intersection with SR 69. It heads north through wooded areas to pass through Hinkle before crossing into Henderson County and immediately enters the Sardis city limits. The highway makes a couple of sharp right turns before passing by Sardis City Park and entering downtown. SR 421 then comes to an end at an intersection between SR 104 and SR 201. The entire route of SR 421 is a two-lane highway, with the Henderson County portion known as Hinkle Road.

Major intersections

References

421
Transportation in Hardin County, Tennessee
Transportation in Henderson County, Tennessee